Winefred Lake is a large lake in east-northern Alberta, Canada.

Ecologically, the lake is set in boreal forest and muskeg environment, with frequent saline water degeneration of the groundwater flow. Winefred lake is drained through Winefred River (Alberta) into Christina River (Alberta) and then in Clearwater River to the Athabasca River.

Winefred Lake is known for fishing, having produced trophy size Northern Pike and Walleye. Hunting is also done around the lake, with moose and deer hunting, as well as trapping.

The  Winefred Lake Indian Reserve of the Chipewyan Prairie First Nation is established on the northern shore of the lake.

See also
Lakes of Alberta

References

Lakes of Alberta
Regional Municipality of Wood Buffalo